Eurovision Choir (formerly Eurovision Choir of the Year) is a choral competition organised by the European Broadcasting Union (EBU) and the . It is modeled after the latter's World Choir Games. Participation is open to non-professional choirs selected by member broadcasters of the EBU.

The inaugural competition took place in 2017 in Riga, Latvia and was won by Slovenia. The second edition took place in Gothenburg, Sweden in 2019 and was won by Denmark. Planning for a third edition was canceled in June 2021 by Interkultur; a host broadcaster for the event had not been selected before the announcement, nor had any countries announced their participation.

In October 2022, it was announced by the EBU that Eurovision Choir would return in 2023, hosted by Latvijas Televīzija for the second time in the contest's history.

Origins 

The concept of Eurovision Choir was first discussed in 2014 as a contest organised by the Latvian national broadcaster LTV and the network Arte, following the positive reception of "Born in Riga", a concert organised by LTV. LTV approached multiple broadcasters including the EBU and Interkultur regarding the organisation of a new contest. The event was officially confirmed on 30 November 2016 depending on a reasonable amount of interest from active members of the European Broadcasting Union. On 21 July 2017, it was announced that the Eurovision Choir of the Year would be a biennial contest unless viewing figures were higher than expected.

The inaugural contest was hosted by the Latvian broadcaster Latvijas Televīzija (LTV) and took place on 22 July 2017, coinciding with the closing ceremony of the European Choir Games 2017.

Format
Participating EBU-member broadcasters select a non-professional choir or a cappella ensemble to represent their home country to compete for the title of the Eurovision Choir of the Year, with prizes including a recording contract for the winning choir. Each choir performs an unaccompanied set of approximately six minutes in any genre and is adjudicated by a panel of choral music professionals who decide the winner. In 2019, three finalists were chosen to present a second set by which the final ranking was decided.

Participation 

Listed are all the countries that have ever taken part in the competition alongside the year in which they made their debut:

Hosting

Unlike other Eurovision contests, where the host country is or is chosen by the previous year's winning country, Eurovision Choir has been held as a component of Interkultur's Grand Prix of Nations & European Choir Games, with the contest being held in the country hosting said events. Most of the expense of the contest is covered by commercial sponsors and contributions from the other participating nations. The table below shows a list of cities and venues that have hosted Eurovision Choir, one or more times. Future venues are shown in italics.

Winning entries

References

External links 

 

Eurovision Choir
Choral festivals
Singing competitions
Choir of the Year
European music
Recurring events established in 2017
2017 establishments in Europe
Awards established in 2017